Priest Rapids Lake is a reservoir on the Columbia River in the U.S. state of Washington. It was created in 1959 with the construction of Priest Rapids Dam. The reservoir stretches from there upstream to the Wanapum Dam.

See also
 List of dams in the Columbia River watershed

References

Lakes of Grant County, Washington
Lakes of Kittitas County, Washington
Reservoirs in Washington (state)
Bodies of water of Yakima County, Washington
Protected areas of Grant County, Washington
Protected areas of Kittitas County, Washington
Protected areas of Yakima County, Washington
1959 establishments in Washington (state)